Films produced in Norway in the 1960s:

1960s

External links
 Norwegian film at the Internet Movie Database

1960s
Norwegian
Films